The Belt is the debut studio album by American band In The Valley Below. The album was recorded in the band's home studio where they handled all engineering and production and mixing on two tracks, with the others being mixed by respected producers such as Dave Sardy who has worked with bands such as Oasis. The band found success with the single Peaches, which  peaked at number 18 on the Billboard Alternative Songs chart in 2016.

Themes and composition
Pop Matters described the album's sound as a mix of 1980's synth pop, Fleetwood Mac, and Depeche Mode.

Reception
The album was generally well received by critics. Pop Matters praised the vocal interplay between Angela Gail Mattson and Jeffrey Jacob Mendel, concluding that "the most striking and amazing quality about In the Valley Below is their singing. Sometimes the duo shares harmony, and sometimes they trade off lines to astonishing effect. This is the line that runs throughout the disc, and it becomes clear that not only does this outfit have a passion for making music, but they also can carefully construct a call-and-response aesthetic that is quite pleasing."

Track listing

Personnel

 Angela Gail Mattson – vocals, synthesizers, production & engineering (all tracks); mixing (2 tracks)
 Jeffrey Jacob Mendel – vocals, guitars, production & engineering (all tracks) mixing (2 tracks)
 John Congleton – mixing
 Dave Sardy – mixing
 Lasse Marten - mixing

References

2014 debut albums